Naogaon-4 is a constituency represented in the Jatiya Sangsad (National Parliament) of Bangladesh since 2008 by Emaz Uddin Pramanik of the Awami League.

Boundaries 
The constituency encompasses Manda Upazila.

History 
The constituency was created in 1984 from the Rajshahi-7 constituency when the former Rajshahi District was split into four districts: Nawabganj, Naogaon, Rajshahi, and Natore.

Members of Parliament

Elections

Elections in the 2010s

Elections in the 2000s

Elections in the 1990s

References

External links
 

Parliamentary constituencies in Bangladesh
Naogaon District